Merton is a surname of English origin. Notable people with the surname include:

 Alice Merton (born 1993), Canadian-British-German-Irish singer-songwriter
 Don Merton (1939–2011), New Zealand conservationist 
 Ernst Merton (1848–1920), American politician and lawyer
 Hugo Merton (1879–1940), German zoologist
 Paul Merton (born 1957), British actor and comedian
 Robert C. Merton (born 1944), American Nobel Prize–winning economist
 Robert K. Merton (1910–2003), American sociologist, father of Robert C. Merton
 Thomas Merton (1915–1968), American Cistercian monk, social activist and author
 Sir Thomas Ralph Merton KBE FRS (1888–1969), British physicist and art collector
 Walter de Merton (c. 1205 – 1277), Bishop of Rochester, England and founder of Merton College
 William Merton (1917–2014), British scientist and banker
 William "Bill" Ralph Merton (1917–2004), British military scientist and merchant banker
 William Ralph Merton (1848–1916), German entrepreneur, founder of the University of Frankfurt and Metallgesellschaft AG
 Zachary Merton (1843–1915), Anglo-German industrialist and philanthropist

English toponymic surnames